Thomas Marks (born July 2, 1980, in Vancouver, British Columbia) is a male water polo player from Canada. He was a member of the Canada men's national water polo team, that claimed the bronze medal at the 2007 Pan American Games in Rio de Janeiro, Brazil.

Playing as a holechecker, Marks was named MVP at 2004 National Water Polo Championship.

References
 Canadian Olympic Committee

1980 births
Living people
Canadian male water polo players
Sportspeople from Vancouver
Water polo players at the 2008 Summer Olympics
Olympic water polo players of Canada
University of Calgary alumni
Pan American Games bronze medalists for Canada
Pan American Games medalists in water polo
Water polo players at the 2003 Pan American Games
Water polo players at the 2007 Pan American Games
Medalists at the 2003 Pan American Games
Medalists at the 2007 Pan American Games